The Synnyr mine is a large potash mine located in eastern Russia in Sakha Republic. Synnyr represents one of the largest potash reserves in Russia having estimated reserves of 500 million tonnes of ore grading 19% potassium chloride metal.

See also 
 List of mines in Russia

References 

Potash mines in Russia